Moonah may refer to:
Moonah, Tasmania
Melaleuca lanceolata
Melaleuca preissiana
Moonah Links, a golf course